The twelfth cycle of America's Next Top Model premiered on March 4, 2009, and was the sixth season to air on The CW network. The cycle's catchphrase was "Get in the Fold." The cycle's promotional song was Lady Gaga's "The Fame."

The prizes for this cycle were:

 A modelling contract with Elite Model Management.
 A fashion spread and cover in Seventeen.
 A 100,000 contract with CoverGirl cosmetics.

The first half of the cycle took place in New York City; the prior season was located in Los Angeles. The international destination for this cycle was São Paulo, Brazil, the show's first and only visit to South America.

The number of girls was reduced to thirteen for the first time since Cycle 9, after being maintained at fourteen in the last two cycles. This was the last time Paulina Porizkova participated as judge.

The winner was 20-year-old Teyona Anderson from New Jersey, with Allison Harvard placing as the runner up. This season averaged 4.35 million viewers per episode.

Contestants
(Ages stated are at start of contest)

Episodes

Cycle 12 Finale Party (Reunion)
The reunion aired May 13, 2009 on The Tyra Banks Show and was the third one after cycles 5 and 10. It was graduation themed and all the girls (except for Sandra, who didn't attend) wore bikinis. The girls were voted yearbook-style as follows:

Various girls were interviewed after their vote was revealed. Fo revealed she had met her father, whom she didn't know was black until she was six. Fo claimed that she had coined the phrase "blaxican" at 12, despite the fact that the term first appeared in the United States in the 1980s. Celia got her one featurette about her personal style and London went on to preach on the streets of New York City. Tyra also discussed Allison's nosebleeding picture of her and Tyra made a montage of her and Robert Pattinson. Natalie revealed she suffered from panic attacks and hypochondria.

Tyra brought a general from the US Army to discuss her positive impact on burnt soldiers and Tahlia did a shoot with a burnt soldier and another burn survivor where they displayed their scars. It was also revealed that Tahlia had become pregnant since the taping of the show. Then elderly people reenacted memorable scenes introduced by Bianca Golden from cycle 9. Those included Fo's haircut, Celia's rebellion against Tyra and Natalie's and Aminat's face off. Celia said that all things were settled between her and Tahlia and when Tyra said "Don't mess with a girl's money", Celia joked back that Tahlia was messing with hers.

The show ended with Tyra revealing that two contestants had been offered a contract with Nous Model Management by Kenya Knight which were revealed on her show's website as being Allison and Fo.

Summaries

Call-out order

 The contestant was eliminated
 The contestant won the competition

Bottom two

 The contestant was eliminated after their first time in the bottom two
 The contestant was eliminated after their second time in the bottom two
 The contestant was eliminated after their third time in the bottom two
 The contestant was eliminated after their fourth time in the bottom two
 The contestant was eliminated in the final judging and placed as the runner-up

Photo Shoot Guide

Episode 1 photo shoot (casting): Goddess profile/type of goddess
Episode 2 photo shoot: Childhood games
Episode 3 photo shoot: Lighting oneself in a warehouse
Episode 4 photo shoot: Couture New York City sight-seeing in pairs
Episode 5 photo shoot: Ellis Island immigrants
Episode 6 photo shoot: Beauty shots evoking different colors
Episode 7 Commercial: CoverGirl micro mineral foundation
Episode 9 photo shoot: Crazed Ciara fans tangled in wires
Episode 10 photo shoot: Embodying Carmen Miranda on a Favela
Episode 11 photo shoot: Swimsuits on a tourist beach
Episode 12 photo shoot: Exotic birds
Episode 13 photo shoot & Commercial: CoverGirl outlast lipstain print ad and commercial & Seventeen Magazine covers

Makeovers
 Jessica - Cut to shoulder-length with dark red highlights
 Nijah - Long black weave
 Kortnie - Trimmed and dyed red
 Sandra - Buzz cut and dyed blonde
 Tahlia - Shoulder-length golden blonde weave
 London - Agyness Deyn inspired cut and dyed platinum blonde 
 Natalie - No makeover
 Fo - Pixie cut
 Celia - Cut short and dyed platinum blonde
 Aminat - Naomi Campbell inspired long weave
 Allison - Long blonde extensions and eyebrows lightened
 Teyona - Slicked-back jheri curl weave; later, long curly weave

Post-Top Model careers
Celia Ammerman has modeled for the New York Post and Vogue Italia. She has also been featured on Racked.com, in the September 2009 issue of Allure and in Short Hair. She has appeared on The Tyra Banks Show, and walked in New York Fashion Week 2011 for Marlon Globel.
Teyona Anderson was signed was Elite Model Management in New York, United States and Cape Town, South Africa. She is currently signed with Mega Models in Miami, and Base Model Agency in Cape Town under the name "Asia Anderson".
Aminat Ayinde has modeled for Zulu Rose and walked in the This Day/Arise: African Fashion Collection S/S 10 show. She is signed to MMG Models in New York. She modeled on season 2 of Project Runway All Stars for Emilio Sosa and on season 14 for Edmond Nelson for his finale collection wearing his first look. 
Tahlia Brookins has modeled for People.
Kortnie Coles is currently signed with Wilhelmina Models in New York City and Models 1 in London.
Isabella Falk is currently signed with Elite Model Management in Chicago under her real name, Kelly Marie.
 Nijah Harris has modeled for That Girl.
Allison Harvard was signed with Nous Model Management in Los Angeles. She competed in cycle 17 among other previous contestants, finishing in second place to Lisa D'Amato. She appeared in the final episode of cycle 21. She has walked in New York Fashion Week 2012 for Malan Breton, Gemma Khang, and Richie Rich. She also walked in Philippine Fashion Week for Michael Cinco. She is the face of Cinco's fragrance "Impalpable". She also modeled for Bench in "Bench Universe". She runs an art and photography studio in Brooklyn. On September 21, 2012, it was announced that Harvard would be making her acting debut as the character Carina in the independent feature film Insensate. On October 6, 2012, Harvard made an appearance in an episode of "I Am Meg: Own the World in Style", a Philippines TV modeling competition.
London Levi appeared in the October 2009 issue of Playboy.
Sandra Nyanchoka was signed with Major Model Management in New York.
Natalie Pack is currently signed with NEXT Model Management in Miami and Ford Models in Los Angeles. She has modeled for Jockey and BL!SSS' July 2009 issue. She walked for Billabong and Dona Daneshi's "I Am Mystic". She later crowned Miss California USA 2012 and competed in Miss USA 2012.
Fo Porter is currently signed with Nous Model Management in Los Angeles. She has modeled for H&M, Revolve clothing and Nylon. She also had campaigns with Reebok, Nike, Abercrombie & Fitch, Billabong, Target and Payless.  She was featured in the music videos for Justin Timberlake's "Tunnel Vision" and Usher's "Good Kisser".
Jessica Santiago is currently signed with Ford Models in Los Angeles. She participated in Nuestra Belleza Latina, but was eliminated before the contestants were chosen. She also competed in Model Latina where she finished as the runner-up. She was a contestant in Miss Universe Puerto Rico 2011, and placed as the second runner-up.

Notes

References

External links
Official website
 

A12
2009 American television seasons
Television shows shot in the Las Vegas Valley
Television shows filmed in New York City
Television shows filmed in São Paulo (state)